General Cartwright may refer to:

James Cartwright (born 1949), U.S. Marine Corps four-star general
Roscoe Cartwright (1919–1974), U.S. Army brigadier general
William Cartwright (British Army officer, died 1827) (–1827), British Army general
William Cartwright (British Army officer, died 1873) (1797–1873), British Army general
Malcolm Cartwright-Taylor (1911–1969), Royal Marines general